Duncan Weir (born 10 May 1991) is a Scotland international rugby union rugby player. He plays professional rugby for United Rugby Championship side Glasgow Warriors at fly-half.

Rugby Union career

Amateur career

Weir was educated at Cathkin High School. He played for Cambuslang RFC.

Weir was drafted to Glasgow Hawks for the 2010-11 and 2011-12 seasons. Drafting meant he could play for an amateur side when not used by his professional club.

Weir was drafted to Aberdeen GSFP for the 2012-13 season; and Stirling County for the 2013-14 season. In the 2014-15 season, Weir was drafted to Currie; at the time Currie - an Edinburgh club - was nominally under Glasgow Warriors' purview.

Weir's move to Edinburgh Rugby meant that he was then drafted to amateur clubs under Edinburgh's purview instead. So Weir was drafted to Hawick in 2016-17; and then Boroughmuir for season 2017-18.

Professional career

Weir made his professional competitive debut for Glasgow Warriors on 23 April 2010 against Leinster Rugby at Firhill Stadium in the Celtic League, becoming Glasgow Warrior No. 181.

In March 2014, Weir signed a new two-year contract with Glasgow Warriors.  He won the Pro12 title with Glasgow in season 2014-15.

On 24 January 2016, Weir left Glasgow to join 1872 Cup rivals Edinburgh on a two-year deal from the 2016-17 season.

After racking up 221 points in 30 games during his time at BT Murrayfield Stadium, he left Edinburgh to join English side Worcester Warriors in the Premiership Rugby on a one-year deal. Weir continued to perform at Worcester and in December 2018, he signed a new two-year extension with the club.

On 13 January 2021, Weir returned home to Scotland to re-join Glasgow Warriors which started his professional career ahead of the 2021-22 season.

International career

Weir was reserve Fly-Half for Scotland's 2013 Six Nations campaign but with Scotland failing to score tries, Weir's Glasgow teammate Ruaridh Jackson was dropped and Weir stepped in. He started Scotland's final two games in the Championship which Scotland finished in third place.

Weir was starting fly-half for Scotland's 2014 Six Nations having impressed in Glasgow's successful season. He scored a last minute Drop-goal to beat Italy in Rome for the first time since 2006. 

Weir received a call-up to the Scotland squad for the 2017 Six Nations Championship.

Weir was called up to Scotland’s extended Six Nations squad in 2019 after an outstanding first season with Worcester Warriors. His consistent form coupled with Scotland’s decision to suspend Finn Russell for a breach of team protocols led to another recall ahead of the 2020 Six Nations.

References

External links

Worcester Warriors Profile
Ultimate Rugby Profile

1991 births
Living people
Aberdeen GSFP RFC players
Boroughmuir RFC players
Cambuslang RFC players
Currie RFC players
Edinburgh Rugby players
Glasgow Hawks players
Glasgow Warriors players
Hawick RFC players
People educated at Cathkin High School
Rugby union fly-halves
Rugby union players from Rutherglen
Scotland international rugby union players
Scottish rugby union players
Stirling County RFC players
Worcester Warriors players